In mathematics,  Enriques surfaces are algebraic surfaces such that the irregularity q = 0 and  the canonical line bundle K is non-trivial but has trivial square. Enriques surfaces are all projective (and therefore Kähler over the complex numbers) and are elliptic surfaces of genus 0.
Over fields of characteristic not 2 they are quotients of K3 surfaces by a group of order 2 acting without fixed points and their theory is similar to that of algebraic K3 surfaces.

Enriques surfaces can also be defined over other fields.
Over fields of characteristic other than 2,  showed  that the theory is similar to that over the complex numbers. These two extra families are related to the two non-discrete algebraic group schemes of order 2 in characteristic 2.

Invariants of complex Enriques surfaces
The plurigenera Pn are 1 if n is even and 0 if n is odd. The fundamental group has order 2. The second cohomology group H2(X, Z) is isomorphic to the sum of the unique even unimodular lattice II1,9 of dimension 10 and signature -8 and a group of order 2.

Hodge diamond:

Marked Enriques surfaces form a connected 10-dimensional family, which  showed is rational.

Characteristic 2

In characteristic 2 there are some new families of Enriques surfaces,
sometimes called quasi Enriques surfaces or non-classical Enriques surfaces or (super)singular Enriques surfaces. (The term "singular" does not mean that the surface has singularities, but means that the surface is "special" in some way.)
In characteristic 2 the definition of Enriques surfaces is modified: they are defined to be minimal surfaces whose canonical class K is numerically equivalent to 0 and whose second Betti number is 10. (In characteristics other than 2 this is equivalent to the usual definition.) There are now 3 families of Enriques surfaces:
Classical: dim(H1(O)) = 0. This implies 2K = 0 but K is nonzero, and Picτ is Z/2Z. The surface is a quotient of a reduced singular Gorenstein surface by the group scheme μ2.
Singular:  dim(H1(O)) = 1 and is acted on non-trivially by the Frobenius endomorphism. This implies K = 0, and Picτ is μ2. The surface is a quotient of a K3 surface by the group scheme Z/2Z.
Supersingular:  dim(H1(O)) = 1 and is acted on trivially by the Frobenius endomorphism. This implies K = 0, and Picτ is α2. The surface is a quotient of a reduced singular Gorenstein surface by the group scheme α2.

All Enriques surfaces are elliptic or quasi elliptic.

Examples

A Reye congruence is the family of lines contained in at least 2 quadrics of a given 3-dimensional linear system of quadrics in P3. If the linear system is generic then the Reye congruence is an Enriques surface.
 Take a surface of degree 6 in 3 dimensional projective space with double lines along the edges of a tetrahedron, such as

for some general homogeneous polynomial Q of degree 2. Then its normalization is an Enriques surface.

 The quotient of a K3 surface by a fixed point free involution is an Enriques surface, and all Enriques surfaces in characteristic other than 2 can be constructed like this. For example, if S is the K3 surface w4 + x4 + y4 + z4 = 0 and T is the order 4 automorphism taking (w,x,y,z) to (w,ix,–y,–iz) then T2 has eight fixed points. Blowing up these eight points and taking the quotient by T2 gives a K3 surface with a fixed-point-free involution T, and the quotient of this by T is an Enriques surface. Alternatively, the Enriques surface can be constructed by taking the quotient of the original surface by the order 4 automorphism T and resolving the eight singular points of the quotient. Another example is given by taking the intersection of 3 quadrics of the form Pi(u,v,w) + Qi(x,y,z) = 0 and taking the quotient by the involution taking (u:v:w:x:y:z) to (–x:–y:–z:u:v:w). For generic quadrics this involution is a fixed-point-free involution of a K3 surface so the quotient is an Enriques surface.

See also
List of algebraic surfaces
Enriques–Kodaira classification
Supersingular variety

References

Compact Complex Surfaces by Wolf P. Barth, Klaus Hulek, Chris A.M. Peters, Antonius Van de Ven  This is the standard reference book for compact complex surfaces.

Complex surfaces
Birational geometry
Algebraic surfaces